All the Leaves Are Gone is an album by Josephine Foster and The Supposed, released in 2004.

Track listing
"Well-Heeled Men" – 5:40
"The Most Loved One" – 3:52
"All the Leaves Are Gone" – 3:37
"Nana" – 4:31
"Deathknell" – 3:43
"Silly Song" – 4:37
"Jailbird (Hero of the Sorrow)" – 3:28
"Worried and Sorry" – 3:08
"Who Will Feel Bitter at the Days End?" – 3:46
"John Ave. Seen from the Gray Train" – 4:34
"Don't Wait, Mary Jane" – 3:50
"(You Are Worth) A Million Dollars" - 2:23

Personnel
Josephine Foster (vocals, classical guitar, tambourine)
Brian Goodman (vocals, electric guitar, bass guitar)
Rusty Peterson (drums).

References

2004 albums
Josephine Foster albums